New Brunswick Community College (NBCC) is a community college located throughout various locations in New Brunswick, Canada including Moncton, Miramichi, Fredericton (its head office), Saint John, St. Andrews, and Woodstock.

New Brunswick Community College provides over 90 programs, offered at six campuses as well as First Nations sites and regional delivery sites throughout the province of New Brunswick.

On May 29, 2010, New Brunswick Community College embarked on a self-governance model with the proclamation of the New Brunswick Community Colleges Act. The move established NBCC as an autonomous Crown Corporation whereby the President and CEO of the college reports to an elected Board of Governors.

Programs
New Brunswick Community College offers over 90 regular programs across 18 sectors and provides other training in many apprenticeable trades, to corporate clients, and to individuals through part-time courses.

New Brunswick Community College was one of the first colleges in North America to offer a program in video game design.

International Projects and Research Initiatives
 Pan-Canadian Student Mobility Program (PSMP) (2004-2007), which provided numerous exchange opportunities between New Brunswick students and British Columbia students. 
 New Brunswick Community College was a founding member in the formation of the Atlantic Colleges Tourism Education Consortia (ACTEC), whose membership included post-secondary education institutional representatives from the provinces of New Brunswick, Nova Scotia, and Prince Edward Island.  ACTEC provided cross-institutional learning New Brunswick Community College for tourism students as well as professional development possibilities for faculty and staff in the industry. 
 NBCC is a founding member of the Cross-border Higher Education Program, which provides a supported transition for college students who wish to continue academic pathways in post-secondary studies in bachelor's or master's degree programs. Member partners also include St. Stephen's University in St. Stephen, New Brunswick;Washington County Community College in Calais, Maine; and University of Maine in Machias, Maine. 
 In 1999, New Brunswick Community College received the Canadian International Development Agency (CIDA) Award of Excellence for its Canadian College Partnership Programs work in Jordan.
 Again in 2002, New Brunswick Community College was recognized by the Canadian International Development Agency (Award of Excellence) for its international partnership with Universidad de Cienfuegos (UCF) in Cuba. Of critical importance for Universidad de Cienfuegos was the development and implementation of the Extension Services Centre.

See also
 Higher education in New Brunswick
 List of universities in New Brunswick
 Canadian government scientific research organizations
 Canadian university scientific research organizations
 Canadian industrial research and development organizations

References

External links
 

Education in Charlotte County, New Brunswick
Education in Carleton County, New Brunswick
Education in Fredericton
Education in Miramichi, New Brunswick
Education in Saint John, New Brunswick
Schools in Moncton
Colleges in New Brunswick
Woodstock, New Brunswick
Saint Andrews, New Brunswick